Tyrannosauridae (or tyrannosaurids, meaning "tyrant lizards") is a family of coelurosaurian theropod dinosaurs that comprises two subfamilies containing up to thirteen genera, including the eponymous Tyrannosaurus. The exact number of genera is controversial, with some experts recognizing as few as three. All of these animals lived near the end of the Cretaceous Period and their fossils have been found only in North America and Asia.

Although descended from smaller ancestors, tyrannosaurids were almost always the largest predators in their respective ecosystems, putting them at the apex of the food chain. Tyrannosaurids were bipedal carnivores with massive skulls filled with large teeth. Despite their large size, their legs were long and proportioned for fast movement. In contrast, their arms were very small, bearing only two functional digits.

Unlike most other groups of dinosaurs, very complete remains have been discovered for most known tyrannosaurids. This has allowed a variety of research into their biology. Scientific studies have focused on their ontogeny, biomechanics and ecology, among other subjects.

History of discovery

The first remains of tyrannosaurids were uncovered during expeditions led by the Geological Survey of Canada, which located numerous scattered teeth. These distinctive dinosaur teeth were given the name Deinodon ("terrible tooth") by Joseph Leidy in 1856. The first good specimens of a tyrannosaurid were found in the Horseshoe Canyon Formation of Alberta, and consisted of nearly complete skulls with partial skeletons. These remains were first studied by Edward Drinker Cope in 1876, who considered them a species of the eastern tyrannosauroid Dryptosaurus. In 1905, Henry Fairfield Osborn recognized that the Alberta remains differed considerably from Dryptosaurus, and coined a new name for them: Albertosaurus sarcophagus ("flesh-eating Alberta lizard"). Cope described more tyrannosaur material in 1892, in the form of isolated vertebrae, and gave this animal the name Manospondylus gigas. This discovery was mostly overlooked for over a century, and caused controversy in the early 2000s when it was discovered that this material actually belonged to, and had name priority over, Tyrannosaurus rex.

In his 1905 paper naming Albertosaurus, Osborn described two additional tyrannosaur specimens that had been collected in Montana and Wyoming during a 1902 expedition of the American Museum of Natural History, led by Barnum Brown. Initially, Osborn considered these to be distinct species. The first, he named Dynamosaurus imperiosus ("emperor power lizard"), and the second, Tyrannosaurus rex ("king tyrant lizard"). A year later, Osborn recognized that these two specimens actually came from the same species. Despite the fact that Dynamosaurus had been found first, the name Tyrannosaurus had appeared one page earlier in his original article describing both specimens. Therefore, according to the International Code of Zoological Nomenclature (ICZN), the name Tyrannosaurus was used.

Barnum Brown went on to collect several more tyrannosaurid specimens from Alberta, including the first to preserve the shortened, two-fingered forelimbs characteristic of the group (which Lawrence Lambe named Gorgosaurus libratus, "balanced fierce lizard", in 1914). A second significant find attributed to Gorgosaurus was made in 1942, in the form of a well-preserved, though unusually small, complete skull. The specimen waited until after the end of World War II to be studied by Charles W. Gilmore, who named it Gorgosaurus lancesnis. This skull was re-studied by Robert T. Bakker, Phil Currie, and Michael Williams in 1988, and assigned to the new genus Nanotyrannus. It was also in 1946 that paleontologists from the Soviet Union began expeditions into Mongolia, and uncovered the first tyrannosaur remains from Asia. Evgeny Maleev described new Mongolian species of Tyrannosaurus and Gorgosaurus in 1955, and one new genus: Tarbosaurus ("terrifying lizard"). Subsequent studies, however, showed that all of Maleev's tyrannosaur species were actually one species of Tarbosaurus at different stages of growth. A second species of Mongolian tyrannosaurid was found later, described by Sergei Kurzanov in 1976, and given the name Alioramus remotus ("remote different branch"), though its status as a true tyrannosaurid and not a more primitive tyrannosaur is still controversial.

Description

The tyrannosaurids were all large animals, with all species capable of weighing at least 1 metric ton. The massive Tyrannosaurus reached  in the largest specimen, RSM P2523.8.

Skull and dentition

Tyrannosaurid skull anatomy is well understood, as complete skulls are known for all genera but Alioramus, which is known only from partial skull remains. Tyrannosaurus, Tarbosaurus, and Daspletosaurus had skulls that exceeded  in length. Adult tyrannosaurids had tall, massive skulls, with many bones fused and reinforced for strength. At the same time, hollow chambers within many skull bones and large openings (fenestrae) between those bones helped to reduce skull weight. Many features of tyrannosaurid skulls were also found in their immediate ancestors, including tall premaxillae and fused nasal bones.

Tyrannosaurid skulls had many unique characteristics, including fused parietal bones with a prominent sagittal crest, which ran longitudinally along the sagittal suture and separated the two supratemporal fenestrae on the skull roof. Behind these fenestrae, tyrannosaurids had a characteristically tall nuchal crest, which also arose from the parietals but ran along a transverse plane rather than longitudinally. The nuchal crest was especially well-developed in Tyrannosaurus, Tarbosaurus and Alioramus. Albertosaurus, Daspletosaurus and Gorgosaurus had tall crests in front of the eyes on the lacrimal bones, while Tarbosaurus and Tyrannosaurus had extremely thickened postorbital bones forming crescent-shaped crests behind the eyes. Alioramus had a row of six bony crests on top of its snout, arising from the nasal bones; lower crests have been reported on some specimens of Daspletosaurus and Tarbosaurus, as well as the more basal tyrannosauroid Appalachiosaurus. The snout and other parts of the skull also sported numerous foramina. According to the 2017 study which described D. horneri, scaly integument as well as tactile sensitivity was correlated with the multiple rows of neurovascular foramina seen in crocodilians and tyrannosaurids.

Tyrannosaurids, like their tyrannosauroid ancestors, were heterodonts, with premaxillary teeth D-shaped in cross section and smaller than the rest. Unlike earlier tyrannosauroids and most other theropods, the maxillary and mandibular teeth of mature tyrannosaurids are not blade-like but extremely thickened and often circular in cross-section, with some species having reduced serrations. Tooth counts tend to be consistent within species, and larger species tend to have lower tooth counts than smaller ones. For example, Alioramus had 76 to 78 teeth in its jaws, while Tyrannosaurus had between 54 and 60.

William Abler observed in 2001 that Albertosaurus tooth serrations resemble a crack in the tooth ending in a round void called an ampulla. Tyrannosaurid teeth were used as holdfasts for pulling meat off a body, so when a tyrannosaur would have pulled back on a piece of meat, the tension could cause a purely crack-like serration to spread through the tooth. However, the presence of the ampulla would have distributed these forces over a larger surface area, and lessened the risk of damage to the tooth under strain. The presence of incisions ending in voids has parallels in human engineering. Guitar makers use incisions ending in voids to, as Abler describes, "impart alternating regions of flexibility and rigidity" to the wood they work with. The use of a drill to create an "ampulla" of sorts and prevent the propagation of cracks through material is also used to protect airplane surfaces. Abler demonstrated that a plexiglass bar with incisions called "kerfs" and drilled holes was more than 25% stronger than one with only regularly placed incisions. Unlike tyrannosaurs and other theropods, ancient predators like phytosaurs and Dimetrodon had no adaptations to prevent the crack-like serrations of their teeth from spreading when subjected to the forces of feeding.

Postcranial skeleton

The skull was perched at the end of a thick, S-shaped neck, and a long, heavy tail acted as a counterweight to balance out the head and torso, with the center of mass over the hips. Tyrannosaurids are known for their proportionately very small two-fingered forelimbs, although remnants of a vestigial third digit are sometimes found. Tarbosaurus had the shortest forelimbs compared to its body size, while Daspletosaurus had the longest.

Tyrannosaurids walked exclusively on their hindlimbs, so their leg bones were massive. In contrast to the forelimbs, the hindlimbs were longer compared to body size than almost any other theropods. Juveniles and even some smaller adults, like more basal tyrannosauroids, had longer tibiae than femora, a characteristic of cursorial (fast-running) dinosaurs like ornithomimids. Larger adults had leg proportions characteristic of slower-moving animals, but not to the extent seen in other large theropods like abelisaurids or carnosaurs. The third metatarsals of tyrannosaurids were pinched between the second and fourth metatarsals, forming a structure known as the arctometatarsus.

It is unclear when the arctometatarsus first evolved; it was not present in the earliest tyrannosauroids like Dilong, but was found in the later Appalachiosaurus. This structure also characterized troodontids, ornithomimids and caenagnathids, but its absence in the earliest tyrannosauroids indicates that it was acquired by convergent evolution.

Classification
The name Deinodontidae was coined by Edward Drinker Cope in 1866 for this family, and continued to be used in place of the newer name Tyrannosauridae through the 1960s. The type genus of the Deinodontidae is Deinodon, which was named after isolated teeth from Montana. However, in a 1970 review of North American tyrannosaurs, Dale Russell concluded that Deinodon was not a valid taxon, and used the name Tyrannosauridae in place of Deinodontidae, stating that this was in accordance with ICZN rules. Therefore, Tyrannosauridae is preferred by modern experts.

Tyrannosaurus was named by Henry Fairfield Osborn in 1905, along with the family Tyrannosauridae. The very common suffix -idae is normally appended to zoological family names and is derived from the Greek suffix -ιδαι -, which indicates a plural noun.

Taxonomy

Tyrannosauridae is a family in rank-based Linnaean taxonomy, within the superfamily Tyrannosauroidea and the suborder Theropoda.

Tyrannosauridae is uncontroversially divided into two subfamilies. Albertosaurinae comprises the North American genera Albertosaurus and Gorgosaurus, while Tyrannosaurinae includes Daspletosaurus, Teratophoneus, Bistahieversor, Tarbosaurus, Nanuqsaurus, Zhuchengtyrannus, and Tyrannosaurus itself. Some authors include the species Gorgosaurus libratus in the genus Albertosaurus and Tarbosaurus bataar in the genus Tyrannosaurus, while others prefer to retain Gorgosaurus and Tarbosaurus as separate genera. Albertosaurines are characterized by more slender builds, lower skulls, and proportionately longer tibiae than tyrannosaurines. In tyrannosaurines, the sagittal crest on the parietals continues forward onto the frontals. In 2014, Lü Junchang et al. described the Alioramini as a tribe within the Tyrannosauridae containing the genera Alioramus and Qianzhousaurus. Their phylogenetic analysis indicated that the tribe was located at the base of the Tyrannosaurinae. Some authors, such as George Olshevsky and Tracy Ford, have created other subdivisions or tribes for various combinations of tyrannosaurids within the subfamilies. However, these have not been phylogenetically defined, and usually consisted of genera that are now considered synonymous with other genera or species.

Additional subfamilies have been named for more fragmentary genera, including Aublysodontinae and Deinodontinae. However, the genera Aublysodon and Deinodon are usually considered nomina dubia, so they and their eponymous subfamilies are usually excluded from taxonomies of tyrannosaurids. An additional tyrannosaurid, Raptorex, was initially described as a more primitive tyrannosauroid, but likely represents a juvenile tyrannosaurine similar to Tarbosaurus. However, as it is known only from a juvenile specimen, it is also currently considered a nomen dubium.

Phylogeny
With the advent of phylogenetic taxonomy in vertebrate paleontology, Tyrannosauridae has been given several explicit definitions. The original was produced by Paul Sereno in 1998, and included all tyrannosauroids closer to Tyrannosaurus than to either Alectrosaurus, Aublysodon or Nanotyrannus. However, Nanotyrannus is often considered to be a juvenile Tyrannosaurus rex, while Aublysodon is usually regarded as a nomen dubium unsuitable for use in the definition of a clade. Definitions since then have been based on more well-established genera.

In 2001, Thomas R. Holtz Jr. published a cladistic analysis of the Tyrannosauridae. He concluded that there were two subfamilies: the more primitive Aublysodontinae, characterized by unserrated premaxillary teeth; and the Tyrannosaurinae. The Aublysodontinae included Aublysodon, the "Kirtland Aublysodon", and Alectrosaurus. Holtz also found that Siamotyrannus exhibited some of the synapomorphies of the tyrannosauridae, but lay "outside the [family] proper."

Later in the same paper, he proposed that Tyrannosauridae be defined as "all descendants of the most recent common ancestor of Tyrannosaurus and Aublysodon". He also criticized definitions previously proposed by other workers, like one proposed by Paul Sereno, that the Tyrannosauridae was "all taxa closer to "Tyrannosaurus" than to Alectrosaurus, Aublysodon, and Nanotyrannus". Holtz observed that since Nanotyrannus was probably a misidentified T. rex juvenile, Sereno's proposed definition would have the family Tyrannosauridae as a subtaxon of the genus Tyrannosaurus. Further, his proposed definition of the subfamily Tyrannosaurinae would also be limited to Tyrannosaurus.

A 2003 attempt by Christopher Brochu included Albertosaurus, Alectrosaurus, Alioramus, Daspletosaurus, Gorgosaurus, Tarbosaurus and Tyrannosaurus in the definition. Holtz redefined the clade in 2004 to use all of the above as specifiers except for Alioramus and Alectrosaurus, which his analysis could not place with certainty. However, in the same paper, Holtz also provided a completely different definition, including all theropods more closely related to Tyrannosaurus than to Eotyrannus. The most recent definition is that of Sereno in 2005, which defined Tyrannosauridae as the least inclusive clade containing Albertosaurus, Gorgosaurus and Tyrannosaurus.

Cladistic analyses of tyrannosaurid phylogeny often find Tarbosaurus and Tyrannosaurus to be sister taxa, with Daspletosaurus more basal than either. A close relationship between Tarbosaurus and Tyrannosaurus is supported by numerous skull features, including the pattern of sutures between certain bones, the presence of a crescent-shaped crest on the postorbital bone behind each eye, and a very deep maxilla with a noticeable downward curve on the lower edge, among others. An alternative hypothesis was presented in a 2003 study by Phil Currie and colleagues, which found weak support for Daspletosaurus as a basal member of a clade also including Tarbosaurus and Alioramus, both from Asia, based on the absence of a bony prong connecting the nasal and lacrimal bones. Alioramus was found to be the closest relative of Tarbosaurus in this study, based on a similar pattern of stress distribution in the skull.

A related study also noted a locking mechanism in the lower jaw shared between the two genera. In a separate paper, Currie noted the possibility that Alioramus might represent a juvenile Tarbosaurus, but stated that the much higher tooth count and more prominent nasal crests in Alioramus suggest it is a distinct genus. Similarly, Currie uses the high tooth count of Nanotyrannus to suggest that it may be a distinct genus, rather than a juvenile Tyrannosaurus as most other experts believe. However, the discovery and description of Qianzhousaurus reveals that Alioramus is not a close relation to Tarbosaurus, instead belonging to a newly described tribe of tyrannosaurids; the Alioramini. Qianzhousaurus further reveals that similar long-snouted tyrannosaurids were widely distributed throughout Asia and would have shared the same environment while avoiding competition with larger and more robust tyrannosaurines by hunting different prey.

Paleobiology

Growth

Paleontologist Gregory Erickson and colleagues have studied the growth and life history of tyrannosaurids. Analysis of bone histology can determine the age of a specimen when it died. Growth rates can be examined when the age of various individuals are plotted against their size on a graph. Erickson has shown that after a long time as juveniles, tyrannosaurs underwent tremendous growth spurts for about four years midway through their lives. After the rapid growth phase ended with sexual maturity, growth slowed down considerably in adult animals. A tyrannosaurid growth curve is S-shaped, with the maximum growth rate of individuals around 14 years of age.

T. rex juveniles remained under  until approximately 14 years of age, when body size began to increase dramatically. During this rapid growth phase, a young T. rex would gain an average of  a year for the next four years. This slowed after 16 years, and at 18 years of age, the curve plateaus again, indicating that growth slowed dramatically. For example, only  separated the 28-year-old "Sue" from a 22-year-old Canadian specimen (RTMP 81.12.1). This sudden change in growth rate may indicate physical maturity, a hypothesis that is supported by the discovery of medullary tissue in the femur of an 18-year-old T. rex from Montana (MOR 1125, also known as "B-rex"). Medullary tissue is found only in female birds during ovulation, indicating that "B-rex" was of reproductive age.

Other tyrannosaurids exhibit extremely similar growth curves, although with lower growth rates corresponding to their lower adult sizes. Compared to albertosaurines, Daspletosaurus showed a faster growth rate during the rapid growth period due to its higher adult weight. Other authors have suggested higher adult weights for Daspletosaurus; this would change the magnitude of the growth rate, but not the overall pattern. The  specimen from the same quarry is the oldest and largest known, at 28 years of age. For Gorgosaurus, the calculated maximum growth rate is about  during the rapid growth phase, which is comparable to that of Albertosaurus.

The discovery of an embryonic tyrannosaur of an as-yet-unknown genus suggests that tyrannosaurids developed their distinctive skeletal features while developing in the egg. Furthermore, the size of the specimen, a  dentary from the lower jaw found in the Two Medicine Formation of Montana in 1983 and a foot claw found in the Horseshoe Canyon Formation in 2018 and described in 2020, suggests that neonate tyrannosaurids were born with skulls the size of a mouse or similarly sized rodents and may have been roughly the size of a small dog at birth. While eggshells have not been found in association with either specimen, the location where these neonate tyrannosaurids were uncovered suggests these animals were using the same nest sites as other species they lived with and preyed upon. The lack of eggshells associated with these specimens has also opened up speculation to the possibility that tyrannosaurids laid soft-shelled eggs as the genera Mussaurus and Protoceratops are believed to have done.

Fossil footprints from the Wapiti Formation suggest that as tyrannosaurids grew, the feet became wider with thicker toes to support their weight. The broader feet suggest that adult tyrannosaurids were slower-moving than their offspring.

Life history

The end of the rapid growth phase suggests the onset of sexual maturity in Albertosaurus, although growth continued at a slower rate throughout the animals' lives. Sexual maturation while still actively growing appears to be a shared trait among small and large dinosaurs as well as in large mammals, such as humans and elephants. This pattern of relatively early sexual maturation differs strikingly from the pattern in birds, which delay their sexual maturity until after they have finished growing.

By tabulating the number of specimens of each age group, Erickson and his colleagues were able to draw conclusions about life history in tyranosauridae populations. Their analysis showed that while juveniles were rare in the fossil record, subadults in the rapid growth phase and adults were far more common. Over half of the known T. rex specimens appear to have died within six years of reaching sexual maturity, a pattern that is also seen in other tyrannosaurs and in some large, long-lived birds and mammals today. These species are characterized by high infant mortality rates, followed by relatively low mortality among juveniles. Mortality increases again following sexual maturity, partly due to the stresses of reproduction. While this could be due to preservation or collection biases, Erickson hypothesized that the difference was due to low mortality among juveniles over a certain size, which is also seen in some modern large mammals, like elephants. This low mortality may have resulted from a lack of predation, since tyrannosaurs surpassed all contemporaneous predators in size by the age of two. Paleontologists have not found enough Daspletosaurus remains for a similar analysis, but Erickson notes that the same general trend seems to apply.

The tyrannosaurids spent as much as half its life in the juvenile phase before ballooning up to near-maximum size in only a few years. This, along with the complete lack of predators intermediate in size between huge adult tyrannosaurids and other small theropods, suggests these niches may have been filled by juvenile tyrannosaurids. This is seen in modern Komodo dragons, where hatchlings start off as tree-dwelling insectivores and slowly mature into massive apex predators capable of taking down large vertebrates. For example, Albertosaurus have been found in aggregations that some have suggested to represent mixed-age packs.

Locomotion
Locomotion abilities are best studied for Tyrannosaurus, and there are two main issues concerning this: how well it could turn; and what its maximum straight-line speed was likely to have been. Tyrannosaurus may have been slow to turn, possibly taking one to two seconds to turn only 45° – an amount that humans, being vertically oriented and tail-less, can spin in a fraction of a second. The cause of the difficulty is rotational inertia, since much of Tyrannosauruss mass was some distance from its center of gravity, like a human carrying a heavy timber.

Researchers have to rely on various estimating techniques because, while there are many tracks of very large theropods walking, so far none have been found of very large theropods running—and this absence may indicate that they did not run.

Jack Horner and Don Lessem argued in 1993 that Tyrannosaurus was slow and probably could not run (no airborne phase in mid-stride). However, Holtz (1998) concluded that tyrannosaurids and their close relatives were the fastest large theropods. Farlow and colleagues (1995) have argued that a 6- to 8-ton Tyrannosaurus would have been critically or even fatally injured if it had fallen while moving quickly, since its torso would have slammed into the ground at a deceleration of 6 g (six times the acceleration due to gravity, or about 60 metres/s2) and its tiny arms could not have reduced the impact. Thus it is quite possible that Tyrannosaurus also moved fast when necessary and had to accept such risks; this scenario has been studied for Allosaurus too. (Probably a juvenile individual.)
 
Studies by Eric Snively et al., published in 2019 indicate that tyrannosaurids such as Tarbosaurus and Tyrannosaurus itself were more manœuvrable than allosauroids of comparable size due to low rotational inertia compared to their body mass combined with large leg muscles. As a result, it is hypothesized that tyrannosaurids were capable of making relatively quick turns and could likely pivot their bodies more quickly when close to their prey, or that while turning, they could "pirouette" on a single planted foot while the alternating leg was held out in a suspended swing during pursuit. The results of this study potentially could shed light on how agility could have contributed to the success of tyrannosaurid evolution.

Additionally, a 2020 study indicates that tyrannosaurids were exceptionally efficient walkers. Studies by Dececchi et al., compared the leg proportions, body mass, and the gaits of more than 70 species of theropod dinosaurs including tyrannosaurids. The research team then applied a variety of methods to estimate each dinosaur's top speed when running as well as how much energy each dinosaur expended while moving at more relaxed speeds such as when walking. Among smaller to medium-sized species such as dromaeosaurids, longer legs appear to be an adaptation for faster running, in line with previous results by other researchers. The results of the study further indicated that smaller theropods evolved long legs for speed as a means to both aid in hunting and escape from larger predators while larger predatory theropods that evolved long legs did so to reduce the energy costs and increase foraging efficiency, as they were freed from the demands of predation pressure due to their role as apex predators. Compared to more basal groups of theropods in the study, tyrannosaurids showed a marked increase in foraging efficiency due to reduced energy expenditures during hunting and scavenging. This likely resulted in tyrannosaurs having a reduced need for hunting forays and requiring less food to sustain themselves as a result. Additionally, the research, in conjunction with studies that show tyrannosaurs were more agile than other large-bodied theropods, indicates they were quite well-adapted to a long-distance stalking approach followed by a quick burst of speed to go for the kill. Analogies can be noted between tyrannosaurids and modern wolves as a result, supported by evidence that at least some tyrannosaurids such as Albertosaurus were hunting in group settings.

Integument

An ongoing debate in the paleontological community surrounds the extent and nature of tyrannosaurid integumentary covering. Long filamentous structures have been preserved along with skeletal remains of numerous coelurosaurs from the Early Cretaceous Yixian Formation and other nearby geological formations from Liaoning, China. These filaments have usually been interpreted as "protofeathers," homologous with the branched feathers found in birds and some non-avian theropods, although other hypotheses have been proposed. A skeleton of Dilong was described in 2004 that included the first example of "protofeathers" in a tyrannosauroid. Similarly to down feathers of modern birds, the "protofeathers" found in Dilong were branched but not pennaceous, and may have been used for insulation. The discovery and description of the  feathered tyrannosauroid Yutyrannus in 2012 indicates the possibility large tyrannosaurids were also feathered as adults.

Based on the principle of phylogenetic bracketing, it was predicted that tyrannosaurids might also possess such feathering. However, a study in 2017 published by a team of researchers in Biology Letters described tyrannosaurid skin impressions collected in Alberta, Montana, and Mongolia, which came from five genera (Tyrannosaurus, Albertosaurus, Gorgosaurus, Daspletosaurus and Tarbosaurus). Although the skin impressions are small, they are widely dispersed across the post-cranium, being collectively located on the abdomen, thoracic region, ilium, pelvis, tail, and neck. They show a tight pattern of fine, non-overlapping pebbly scales (which co-author Scott Persons compared to those seen on the flanks of a crocodile) and preserve no hints of feathering. The basic texture is composed of tiny "basement scales" approximately 1 to 2 mm in diameter, with some impressions showing 7 mm "feature scales" interspersed between them. Additional scales can be seen in tyrannosaurid footprints. Studies find that the facial integument of tyrannosaurids had scales on the dentary and maxilla, cornified epidermis and armor-like skin on the subordinate regions.

Bell et al. performed an ancestral character reconstruction based on what is known about integument distribution in tyrannosauroids. Despite an 89% probability that tyrannosauroids started out with feathers, they determined that scaly tyrannosaurids have a 97% probability of being true. The data "provides compelling evidence of an entirely squamous covering in Tyrannosaurus," the team wrote, although they conceded that plumage may have still been present on the dorsal region where skin impressions haven't been found yet. Bell et al. hypothesizes that the scale impressions of tyrannosaurids are possibly reticula which are secondarily derived from feathers though evidence is needed to support this. However, others argue that this is because of taphonomic bias in tyrannosaurids.

It has yet to be determined why such an integumentary change might have occurred. A precedent for feather loss can be seen in other dinosaur groups such as ornithischians, in which filamentous structures were lost, and scales reappeared. Although gigantism has been suggested as a mechanism, Phil R. Bell, who co-authored the study, noted that the feathered Yutyrannus overlapped in size with Gorgosaurus and Albertosaurus. "The problem here is that we have big tyrannosaurs, some with feathers, some without that live in pretty similar climates. So what's the reason for this difference? We really don't know."

Vision

The eye-sockets of Tyrannosaurus are positioned so that the eyes would point forward, giving them binocular vision slightly better than that of modern hawks. While predatory theropods in general had binocular vision directly in front of their skull, tyrannosaurs had a significantly larger area of overlap. Jack Horner also pointed out that the tyrannosaur lineage had a history of steadily improving binocular vision. It is hard to see how natural selection would have favored this long-term trend if tyrannosaurs had been pure scavengers, which would not have needed the advanced depth perception that stereoscopic vision provides. In modern animals, binocular vision is found mainly in predators (the principal exceptions are primates, which need it for leaping from branch to branch). Unlike Tyrannosaurus, Tarbosaurus had a narrower skull more typical of other tyrannosaurids in which the eyes faced primarily sideways. All of this suggests that Tarbosaurus relied more on its senses of smell and hearing than on its eyesight. In Gorgosaurus specimens, the eye socket was circular rather than oval or keyhole-shaped as in other tyrannosaurid genera. In Daspletosaurus, this was a tall oval, somewhere in between the circular shape seen in Gorgosaurus and the 'keyhole' shape of Tyrannosaurus.

Facial sensitivity 
Based on comparisons of bone texture of Daspletosaurus with extant crocodilians, a detailed study in 2017 by Thomas D. Carr et al. found that tyrannosaurs had large, flat scales on their snouts.
At the center of these scales were small keratinised patches. In crocodilians, such patches cover bundles of sensory neurons that can detect mechanical, thermal and chemical stimuli. They proposed that tyrannosaurs probably also had bundles of sensory neurons under their facial scales and may have used them to identify objects, measure the temperature of their nests and gently pick-up eggs and hatchlings.

Bony crests

Bony crests are found on the skulls of many theropods, including many tyrannosaurids. Alioramus, a possible tyrannosaurid from Mongolia, bears a single row of five prominent bony bumps on the nasal bones; a similar row of much lower bumps is present on the skull of Appalachiosaurus, as well as some specimens of Daspletosaurus, Albertosaurus, and Tarbosaurus. In Albertosaurus, Gorgosaurus and Daspletosaurus, there is a prominent horn in front of each eye on the lacrimal bone. The lacrimal horn is absent in Tarbosaurus and Tyrannosaurus, which instead have a crescent-shaped crest behind each eye on the postorbital bone. These head crests may have been used for display, perhaps for species recognition or courtship behavior.

Thermoregulation
Tyrannosaurus, like most dinosaurs, was long thought to have an ectothermic ("cold-blooded") reptilian metabolism but was challenged by scientists like Robert T. Bakker and John Ostrom in the early years of the "Dinosaur Renaissance", beginning in the late 1960s. Tyrannosaurus rex itself was claimed to have been endothermic ("warm-blooded"), implying a very active lifestyle. Since then, several paleontologists have sought to determine the ability of Tyrannosaurus to regulate its body temperature. Histological evidence of high growth rates in young T. rex, comparable to those of mammals and birds, may support the hypothesis of a high metabolism. Growth curves indicate that, as in mammals and birds, T. rex growth was limited mostly to immature animals, rather than the indeterminate growth seen in most other vertebrates. It has been indicated that the temperature difference may have been no more than 4 to 5 °C (7 to 9 °F) between the vertebrae of the torso and the tibia of the lower leg. This small temperature range between the body core and the extremities was claimed by paleontologist Reese Barrick and geochemist William Showers to indicate that T. rex maintained a constant internal body temperature (homeothermy) and that it enjoyed a metabolism somewhere between ectothermic reptiles and endothermic mammals. Later they found similar results in Giganotosaurus specimens, who lived on a different continent and tens of millions of years earlier in time. Even if Tyrannosaurus rex does exhibit evidence of homeothermy, it does not necessarily mean that it was endothermic. Such thermoregulation may also be explained by gigantothermy, as in some living sea turtles.

Paleoecology

Coexistence of Daspletosaurus and Gorgosaurus

In the Dinosaur Park Formation, Gorgosaurus lived alongside a rarer species of the tyrannosaurine Daspletosaurus. This is one of the few examples of two tyrannosaur genera coexisting. Similarly sized predators in modern predator guilds are separated into different ecological niches by anatomical, behavioral or geographical differences that limit competition. Niche differentiation between the Dinosaur Park tyrannosaurids is not well understood. In 1970, Dale Russell hypothesized that the more common Gorgosaurus actively hunted fleet-footed hadrosaurs, while the rarer and more troublesome ceratopsians and ankylosaurians (horned and heavily armoured dinosaurs) were left to the more heavily built Daspletosaurus. However, a specimen of Daspletosaurus (OTM 200) from the contemporaneous Two Medicine Formation of Montana preserves the digested remains of a juvenile hadrosaur in its gut region.
Unlike some other groups of dinosaurs, neither genus was more common at higher or lower elevations than the other. However, Gorgosaurus appears more common in northern formations like the Dinosaur Park, with species of Daspletosaurus more abundant to the south. The same pattern is seen in other groups of dinosaurs. Chasmosaurine ceratopsians and hadrosaurine hadrosaurs are also more common in the Two Medicine Formation of Montana and in southwestern North America during the Campanian, while centrosaurines and lambeosaurines dominate in northern latitudes. Holtz has suggested that this pattern indicates shared ecological preferences between tyrannosaurines, chasmosaurines and hadrosaurines. At the end of the later Maastrichtian stage, tyrannosaurines like Tyrannosaurus rex, hadrosaurines like Edmontosaurus and chasmosaurines like Triceratops were widespread throughout western North America, while albertosaurines and centrosaurines became extinct, and lambeosaurines were rare.

Social behavior
There is limited evidence of social behavior among the tyrannosaurids.  Researchers reported that a subadult and a juvenile skeleton were found in the same quarry as the "Sue" specimen, which has been used to support the hypothesis that tyrannosaurs may have lived in social groups of some kind. While there is no evidence of gregarious behavior in Gorgosaurus, there is evidence of some pack behavior for Albertosaurus and Daspletosaurus.

A young specimen of the Dinosaur Park Daspletosaurus species (TMP 94.143.1) shows bite marks on the face that were inflicted by another tyrannosaur. The bite marks are healed over, indicating that the animal survived the bite. A full-grown Dinosaur Park Daspletosaurus (TMP 85.62.1) also exhibits tyrannosaur bite marks, showing that attacks to the face were not limited to younger animals. While it is possible that the bites were attributable to other species, intraspecific aggression, including facial biting, is very common among predators. Facial bites are seen in other tyrannosaurs like Gorgosaurus and Tyrannosaurus, as well as in other theropod genera like Sinraptor and Saurornitholestes. Darren Tanke and Phil Currie hypothesize that the bites are due to intraspecific competition for territory or resources, or for dominance within a social group.

Evidence that Daspletosaurus lived in social groups comes from a bonebed found in the Two Medicine Formation of Montana. The bonebed includes the remains of three Daspletosaurus, including a large adult, a small juvenile, and another individual of intermediate size. At least five hadrosaurs are preserved at the same location. Geologic evidence indicates that the remains were not brought together by river currents but that all of the animals were buried simultaneously at the same location. The hadrosaur remains are scattered and bear many marks from tyrannosaur teeth, indicating that the Daspletosaurus were feeding on the hadrosaurs at the time of death. The cause of death is unknown. Currie speculates that the daspletosaurs formed a pack, although this cannot be stated with certainty. Other scientists are skeptical of the evidence for social groups in Daspletosaurus and other large theropods; Brian Roach and Daniel Brinkman have suggested that Daspletosaurus social interaction would have more closely resembled the modern Komodo dragon, where non-cooperative individuals mob carcasses, frequently attacking and even cannibalizing each other in the process.

The Dry Island bonebed discovered by Barnum Brown and his crew contains the remains of 22 Albertosaurus, the most individuals found in one locality of any Cretaceous theropod, and the second-most of any large theropod dinosaur behind the Allosaurus assemblage at the Cleveland-Lloyd Dinosaur Quarry in Utah. The group seems to be composed of one very old adult; eight adults between 17 and 23 years old; seven sub-adults undergoing their rapid growth phases at between 12 and 16 years old; and six juveniles between the ages of 2 and 11 years, who had not yet reached the growth phase. The near-absence of herbivore remains and the similar state of preservation between the many individuals at the Albertosaurus bonebed quarry led Phil Currie to conclude that the locality was not a predator trap like the La Brea Tar Pits in California, and that all of the preserved animals died at the same time. Currie claims this as evidence of pack behavior. Other scientists are skeptical, observing that the animals may have been driven together by drought, flood or for other reasons.

While it generally remains controversial, evidence does exist that supports the theory that at least some tyrannosaurids were social. In British Columbia's Wapiti Formation, a trackway composed of the footprints of three individual tyrannosaurids (named as the ichnogenus Bellatoripes fredlundi) was discovered by a local outfitter named Aaron Fredlund and described in the journal PLOS One by Richard McCrea et al. An examination of the trackway found no evidence of one trackway being left long after another had been made, further supporting the hypothesis that three individual tyrannosaurs were traveling together as a group. As three different genera of tyrannosaurids (Gorgosaurus, Daspletosaurus, and Albertosaurus, respectively) are known from the formation, it is unknown which genus was the maker of the trackway. Additional evidence in the form of a bone-bed from the Rainbows and Unicorns Quarry in Southern Utah's Kaiparowits Formation described in 2021 attributed to Teratophoneus suggests other tyrannosaurids were also social animals. The fossils, consisting of four or possibly five different animals ranging from 4–22 years of age, suggest a mass mortality event, possibly caused by flooding, or less likely by cyanobacterial toxicosis, fire, or drought. The fact that all of the animals preserved seemed to have perished within a short timespan further strengthens the argument for gregarious behavior in tyrannosaurids, with the bone beds of such genera as Teratophoneus, Albertosaurus, Tyrannosaurus and Daspletosaurus showcasing suggested social behavior may have been widespread amongst tyrannosauridae in general.

Feeding
Tyrannosaur tooth marks are the most commonly preserved feeding traces of carnivorous dinosaurs. They have been reported from ceratopsians, hadrosaurs and other tyrannosaurs. Tyrannosaurid bones with tooth marks represent about 2% of known fossils with preserved tooth marks. Tyrannosaurid teeth were used as holdfasts for pulling meat off a body, rather than knife-like cutting functions. Tooth wear patterns hint that complex head shaking behaviors may have been involved in tyrannosaur feeding.

Speculation on the pack-hunting habits of Albertosaurus were made by a few researchers who suggest that the younger members of the pack may have been responsible for driving their prey towards the adults, who were larger and more powerful, but also slower. Juveniles may also have had different lifestyles than adults, filling predator niches between those of the enormous adults and the smaller contemporaneous theropods, the largest of which were two orders of magnitude smaller than an adult Albertosaurus in mass. However, as the preservation of behavior in the fossil record is exceedingly rare, these ideas cannot readily be tested. Phil Currie speculates that the Daspletosaurus formed packs to hunt, although this cannot be stated with certainty. There is no evidence of such gregarious behavior in Gorgosaurus.

The debate about whether Tyrannosaurus was a predator or a pure scavenger is as old as the debate about its locomotion. Lambe (1917) described a good skeleton of Tyrannosauruss close relative Gorgosaurus and concluded that it and therefore also Tyrannosaurus was a pure scavenger, because the Gorgosauruss teeth showed hardly any wear. This argument is no longer taken seriously, because theropods replaced their teeth quite rapidly. Ever since the first discovery of Tyrannosaurus most scientists have agreed that it was a predator, although like modern large predators it would have been happy to scavenge or steal another predator's kill if it had the opportunity.

Noted hadrosaur expert Jack Horner is currently the major advocate of the idea that Tyrannosaurus was exclusively a scavenger and did not engage in active hunting at all. Horner has presented several arguments to support the pure scavenger hypothesis. The presence of large olfactory bulbs and olfactory nerves suggests a highly developed sense of smell for sniffing out carcasses over great distances. The teeth could crush bone, and therefore could extract as much food (bone marrow) as possible from carcass remnants, usually the least nutritious parts. At least some of its potential prey could move quickly, while evidence suggests that Tyrannosaurus walked instead of ran.

Other evidence suggests hunting behavior in Tyrannosaurus. The eye-sockets of tyrannosaurs are positioned so that the eyes would point forward, giving them binocular vision slightly better than that of modern hawks. Tyrannosaur-inflicted damage has been found on skeletons of hadrosaurs and Triceratops that seemed to have survived initial attacks. Some researchers argue that if Tyrannosaurus were a scavenger, another dinosaur had to be the top predator in the Amerasian Upper Cretaceous. The top prey were the larger marginocephalians and ornithopods. The other tyrannosaurids share so many characteristics with Tyrannosaurus that only small dromaeosaurs remain as feasible top predators. In this light, scavenger hypothesis adherents have suggested that the size and power of tyrannosaurs allowed them to steal kills from smaller predators.

Cannibalism 
Evidence also strongly suggests that tyrannosaurids were at least occasionally cannibalistic. Tyrannosaurus itself has strong evidence pointing towards it having been cannibalistic in at least a scavenging capacity based on tooth marks on the foot bones, humerus, and metatarsals of one specimen. Fossils from the Fruitland Formation, Kirtland Formation (both Campanian in age), and Maastichtian-aged Ojo Alamo Formation suggest that cannibalism was present in various tyrannosaurid genera of the San Juan Basin. The evidence gathered from the specimens suggests opportunistic feeding behavior in tyrannosaurids that cannibalized members of their own species.

Distribution
The earliest known tyranosaur remains occurred between 129.4 and 125 million years ago in Ishikawa, Japan near Lat 36.166668	lng 136.633331. Found by Marsh in 1881 and identified by H.F. Osborne in 1906, the age of the remains was determined by H. Matsuoka et al. in 2002. 
While earlier tyrannosauroids are found on all three northern continents, tyrannosaurid fossils are known only from North America and Asia. Sometimes fragmentary remains uncovered in the Southern Hemisphere have been reported as "Southern Hemisphere tyrannosaurids," although these seem to have been misidentified abelisaurid fossils. 

Tyrannosaurid remains have never been recovered from eastern North America, while more basal tyrannosauroids, like Dryptosaurus and Appalachiosaurus, persisted there until the end of the Cretaceous, indicating that tyrannosaurids must have evolved in or dispersed into western North America after the continent was divided in half by the Western Interior Seaway in the middle of the Cretaceous. Tyrannosaurid fossils have been found in Alaska, which may have provided a route for dispersal between North America and Asia. Alioramus and Tarbosaurus are found to be related in one cladistic analysis, forming a unique Asian branch of the family. This was later disproven with the discovery of Qianzhousaurus and the description of the tyrannosaur family Alioramini. Tyrannosaurid teeth from a large species of unknown variety were discovered in the Nagasaki Peninsula by researchers from the Fukui Prefectural Dinosaur Museum, further expanding the range of the group. The teeth were estimated to be 81 million years old (Campanian Age).

Of the two subfamilies, tyrannosaurines appear to have been more widespread. Albertosaurines are unknown in Asia, which was home to the tyrannosaurines, such as Tarbosaurus and Zhuchengtyrannus, and Qianzhousaurus and Alioramus of the Alioramini. Both the Tyrannosaurinae and Albertosaurinae subfamilies were present in the Campanian and early Maastrichtian stages of North America, with tyrannosaurines like Daspletosaurus ranging throughout the Western Interior, while the albertosaurines Albertosaurus and Gorgosaurus are currently known only from the northwestern part of the continent.

By the late Maastrichtian, albertosaurines appear to have gone extinct, while the tyrannosaurine Tyrannosaurus roamed from Saskatchewan to Texas. This pattern is mirrored in other North American dinosaur taxa. During the Campanian and early Maastrichtian, lambeosaurine hadrosaurs and centrosaurine ceratopsians are common in the northwest, while hadrosaurines and chasmosaurines were more common to the south. By the end of the Cretaceous, centrosaurines are unknown and lambeosaurines are rare, while hadrosaurines and chasmosaurines were common throughout the Western Interior. A study published in the journal Scientific Reports on February 2, 2016, by Steve Brusatte, Thomas Carr et al. indicates that during the later Maastrichtian, Tyrannosaurus itself might have been partially responsible for the extinction of the other tyrannosaurids in most of western North America. The study indicates that Tyrannosaurus might have been an immigrant from Asia as opposed to having evolved in North America (possibly a descendant of the closely related Tarbosaurus) that supplanted and outcompeted other tyrannosaurids. This theory is further supported by the fact that few to no other types of tyrannosaurid are found within Tyrannosaurus' known range.

Timeline of genera

See also
 Timeline of tyrannosaur research

References

External links

 Tyrannosauridae specimen list and discussion at The Theropod Database

Tyrannosaurs
 
Campanian first appearances
Maastrichtian extinctions
Prehistoric dinosaur families